Capsa is the name for a family of packet analyzers developed by Colasoft for network administrators to monitor, troubleshoot and analyze wired & wireless networks. The company provides a free edition for individuals, but paid licenses are available for businesses and enterprises. The software includes Ethernet packet analysis, diagnostics and a security monitoring system.

References

External links
Colasoft Official website
Colasoft Official Blog
Colasoft Capsa FAQ

 

 - lists Colasoft Capsa Free edition

Network analyzers